The 2020–21 Biathlon World Cup – Sprint Women started on 29 November 2020 in Kontiolahti and will finished on 18 March 2021 in Östersund

Competition format
The  sprint race is the third oldest biathlon event; the distance is skied over three laps. The biathlete shoots two times at any shooting lane, first prone, then standing, totalling 10 targets. Competitors' starts are staggered, normally by 30 seconds.

2019–20 Top 3 standings

Medal winners

Standings
7 of 10 competitions scored

References

Sprint Women